Bergh Apton (Ber-Guh App-ton) is a village and civil parish in the South Norfolk district of Norfolk, England, 7 miles (11 km) south-east of Norwich just south of the A146 between Yelverton and Thurton.  According to the 2001 census it had a population of 428 in 186 households, the population increasing to 442 at the 2011 Census.

History
The origin of the name 'Bergh Apton' is from the joining of two separate villages; Apton to the north-west and Bergh to the south-east, each with its own church, the origin of their names are unknown.  Apton was served by the church of St. Martin which lay near the present day Church Farm on Dodgers Lane, its last recorded use being in 1555 and the remains being finally cleared in 1834. Bergh was served by the Church of St. Peter and St. Paul which stands on a low hill overlooking the River Chet which marks the southern boundary of the now combined parish. The church appears to have been reconstructed in the 14th century, with local flint with ashlar and brick details.

Today
The village school was closed in 1981 and the children transferred to Alpington and Bergh Apton CofE voluntary-aided school in Alpington.  The village shop and Post Office closed on 31 December 2012.  In August 2015 the Post Office reopened its Bergh Apton branch within the Green Pastures Plant Centre and Farm Shop on Mill Road. The village hall, opened on the day of Queen Elizabeth's coronation on 2 June 1953 was totally refurbished in 2013 and reopened in November of that year with new facilities and all-ability access.  The hall is regularly used by village societies, the Parish Council, and numerous activities that include a microscopy study group, yoga, painting, singing and dog-training.

Bergh Apton is served by bus route 570 operated by Konectbus providing five services a day into Norwich and out to Seething and Loddon.

Sculpture Trail and Mystery Plays
Beginning in 1997 and repeated in 1999, 2002, 2005, 2008 and 2011, the village hosted six sculpture trails with works from over 60 artists both local to Norfolk and from across the UK, displayed in private gardens and public places. The trails were organised by Bergh Apton Community Arts Trust and became significant South Norfolk tourist attractions.  In the years 2005, 2008 and 2011, they drew over 10,000 visitors over three weekends in late May/early June.

During the 2011 Sculpture Trail, the village, with assistance from the Bishop of Norwich, performed “A Mighty Water”. This Mystery Play, based on the story of Noah, was commissioned from internationally renowned story teller, Hugh Lupton.

In May and June 2014, Bergh Apton was joined by inhabitants of 11 neighbouring villages to perform a Cycle of four Mystery Plays based on the Bible stories in the Legend of the Rood, also commissioned from Hugh Lupton.

War Memorial
Both World Wars took an enormous toll upon the population of Bergh Apton with twenty villagers dying in the First World War alone. Their names are recorded on the memorial located in St. Peter and St. Paul's Churchyard, which was rededicated in May 2007 to include even more men who were associated with the village. The fallen for the First World War are listed as:
 Corporal John A. Boggis, MM (1881-1918), 9th Battalion, Royal Norfolk Regiment
 Lance-Corporal James R. Wright (1885-1918), Royal Military Police
 Lance-Corporal Walter E. Alexander (1892-1916), 1st Battalion, Royal Newfoundland Regiment
 Lance-Corporal Aubrey S. Stone (d.1916), 9th Battalion, Royal Norfolk Regiment
 Private Leonard G. Rope (1889-1916), 31st Battalion, Calgary Rifles, Canadian Army
 Private Ernest A. Leeder (d.1917), 11th Battalion, 3rd (Australian) Division
 Private Henry G. V. Greenacre (1892-1916), 1st Battalion, Coldstream Guards
 Private Charles D. Weddup (d.1915), 1st Battalion, Coldstream Guards
 Private Arthur W. Annis (1882-1916), 7th Battalion, East Yorkshire Regiment
 Pioneer Albert W. Parker (d.1917), 392nd (Road Construction) Company, Royal Engineers
 Private Sidney H. Marks (d.1917), 1st Battalion, Essex Regiment
 Private Sydney G. Keeler (1899-1918), 41st Battalion, Machine Gun Corps
 Private Robert G. Beaumont (1888-1917), 22nd Battalion, Manchester Regiment
 Private Victor G. Gillingwater (1897-1917), 1st Battalion, Royal Marine Light Infantry
 Private Albert H. Rope (1894-1917), Royal Marine Light Infantry
 Private Charles W. Greenacre (d.1916), 2nd Battalion, Royal Norfolk Regiment
 Private Harry S. Mayes (d.1915), 7th Battalion, Royal Norfolk Regiment
 Private Clement S. Wall (1888-1917), 8th Battalion, Royal Norfolk Regiment
 Private Sidney R. Kedge (1895-1916), 6th Battalion, Queen's Royal Regiment (West Surrey)
 Deckhand C. Walter W. Bracey (d.1914), H.M. Trawler Eyrie
 Leonard Cain
 Jack Lovewell
 Archibald Mayes
 Jack Mayes
 Charles Podd

And, the following for the Second World War:
 Petty-Officer John A. Mayes (1903-1941), HMS Cossack (F03)
 Leading-Seaman Archibald R. Mayes (d.1941), HMS Warspite (03)
 Sergeant Jack E. Lovewell (1922-1943), No. 75 (New Zealand) Squadron RAF
 Gunner Herbert C. G. Podd (1916-1942), 74th Field Regiment, Royal Artillery
 Private Leonard W. G. Cain (1920-1944), 7th Battalion, Royal Norfolk Regiment

See also
Bergh Apton Anglo-Saxon cemetery
 Kelly, G. (2005). The Book of Bergh Apton. Honiton: Halsgrove.

References

http://kepn.nottingham.ac.uk/map/place/Norfolk/Bergh%20Apton

External links

Bergh Apton website
2002/5 Sculpture Trail on Flickr

Villages in Norfolk
Sculpture gardens, trails and parks in the United Kingdom
Civil parishes in Norfolk